Payel De, also known as Payel Dey, is a Bengali actress. She began her career in 2006 with Zee Bangla's Ekdin Pratidin daily soap and portrayed the character Chandrayee as a supporting role. She is known for her work in television soap opera serials Durga and Behula where she played the title character, both of these aired on Star Jalsha. She started her career while she was studying in college. Afterwards, she starred as Aalo Moitra in the TV serial Bodhu Kon Alo Laaglo Chokhe which aired on Star Jaisha. She  has also played lead characters in Maa Durga (Colors Bangla), Tobu Mone Rekho (Zee Bangla), Ardhangini (Star Jalsha), Jaahanara (Colors Bangla), Durga Durgeshwari (Star Jalsha), Chuni Panna (Star Jalsha) and currently Desher Maati (Star Jalsha).

Her first feature film was Mayabazaar.
She also dubbed in Bengali movie Fidaa starring Yash and Sanjana.

Apart from serials, she also played Goddess Durga in Durga Durgotinashini in 2016 and Mahishashur Mardini in 2015 on Colors Bangla. In 2021 she was seen in the film Mukhosh directed by Birsa Dasgupta, Produced under Shree Venkatesh Films opposite Anirban Bhattacharyya, Anirban Chakraborti and Chandrayee Ghosh.

Personal life
On 3 February 2012, she married her co-actor from a telefilm ‘Sokol Kata Dhonno Kore’ Dwaipayan Das. The couple loves traveling and mostly embark on tours and treks to the Himalayas. The couple have a son who was born in 2018.

Works

Mahalaya

References 

Bengali television actresses
Living people
Year of birth missing (living people)
University of Calcutta alumni